Heather Wurtele (née Danforth, born July 12, 1979) is a Canadian professional triathlete who races long-distance, non-drafting triathlon events. She has over 60 career professional triathlon podium finishes and 30 plus career wins, including 25 half iron distance wins and 7 Ironman wins. Her career highlights include placing third at the 2016 Ironman 70.3 World Championship, second at the 2015 Ironman 70.3 World Championship and third at the 2014 Ironman 70.3 World Championship. She also placed 3rd at the ITU Long Course World Championships in 2017 and won the North American 70.3 Championships in 2015 and 2016.

Career
Wurtele grew up in Vernon, British Columbia and attended Clarence Fulton High School. While focused on academics growing up she also enjoyed downhill skiing and played volleyball and basketball. Despite her size being an advantage in the latter two sports, and excelling as a middle blocker in volleyball, she admitted that she was not very good at basketball and had no ball handling skills. She then attended the University of British Columbia where she was on the varsity rowing team for four years and would earn a degree forest genetics. She continued on in academia at the University of Victoria earning a master's degree in plant physiology.

Wurtele participated in adventure racing for two years, but grew tired of the equipment intensive sport and didn't enjoy orienteering. Wurtele moved on to participate in a few triathlons in 2004, having some modest success in her age group. She moved to Norway in 2005 so that she could pursue a doctoral degree in plant genetics and forestry. After a year as a full-time student she put getting her Ph.D. on hold and returned to North America where she began intense training as age-group athlete. That year she won the Canadian Long Course Championships, beating former Ironman World Champion Lori Bowden, and then one week later was the first overall female age-group athlete at Ironman Coeur d’Alene. This qualified her for the Ironman World Championships.

In 2007 Wurtele received her pro card after seeing the prize money she was forfeiting as an amateur the previous year. The next year she and husband Trevor, who also received his pro triathlon card, decided to fully commit to the sport of triathlon. As a result, they both quit their jobs, Wurtele's as a lab technician at Natural Resources Canada and Trevor's as a currency broker, they sold most of their possessions, and purchased an RV that they used to travel from race to race and to different training locations. That year she won her first big race as a professional at Ironman Coeur d'Alene. Since then she has notched two more Ironman wins at Coeur d'Alene, two Ironman St. George wins, and a win at Ironman Lake Placid. At Ironman 70.3 and half-iron distance races she has accumulated over two dozen wins.

In October 2019, Wurtele and her husband, Trevor, both jointly announced their retirement from professional racing.

Awards and recognition

Canadian Multi-Sport Female-Athlete-of-the-Year (2013, 2014, 2015, 2016, 2017)
Canadian Long Course Triathlete of the year (2010, 2011)

Personal
While earning her masters Wurtele reconnected with friend and high school classmate, Trevor Wurtele. They were engaged prior to moving together to Norway and were married after returning to Canada.

Results
Wurtele's results include:

References

External links

1979 births
Living people
Canadian female triathletes
University of Victoria alumni
University of British Columbia Faculty of Forestry alumni
Sportspeople from Calgary
Sportspeople from Kelowna